Suratrana (IAST: Suratrāṇa, सुरत्राण) is a Sanskrit word that has been interpreted to mean either "protector of gods", or a transliteration of the Islamic word "Sultan" into Sanskrit. The term consists of two words "sura" (सुर) meaning "deva, gods, deity", and trana (त्राण) meaning "protect, preserve, defend".

Suratrana is found in Indian texts and inscriptions, its interpretation is controversial particularly when the context relates to the post 12th-century medieval period of Hindu-Muslim interaction during Delhi Sultanate and Mughal Empire. For example, the word is found in a long Sanskrit stone inscription found at a temple at Hampi in Karnataka and dated to 1344 CE. The Nāgarī script inscription includes the term Hinduraya Suratrana, which Benjamin Lewis Rice translates as "the Suratrana of Hindu Rayas". The term Hindu raya suratrana is also seen in some stone inscriptions found in Andhra Pradesh, the earliest dated to about 1352 CE.

Some scholars have interpreted this to mean "the Sultan among Hindu kings" and state this to be an evidence of Islamic political traditions being adopted by Hindu kings, as well as that Indian kingdoms recognized their religious identity of being Hindu and of Hinduism by early 14th century. Others interpret the term Hinduraya Suratrana to mean "protectors of the gods of (or among) the Hindu kings".

A few other inscriptions in South India use the word Suratrana, sometimes as part of the term Hinduraya Suratrana, and sometimes in modified form. For example, the Akkalapundi Grant inscription of 1368 CE for Kapaya Nayaka of Warangal who fought the Delhi Sultanate armies, refers to the Nayaka as Andhrasuratranah (Andhra-Suratranah, or the Suratranah of the Andhra). A related term Hinduravu Suradhani (IAST: Hindurāvu Suradhāni) is found in an Ongole inscription for Sariyapati Timmareddi of Andhra region, and is dated to 1482 CE. According to Wagoner, both Suratrana and Suradhani are transliterations of Sultan. Suradhani found in Hindurāvu Suradhāni term is also a composite of two words, "Sura" and "Dhani", with Dhani meaning "possessor, housing, virtuous keeper". The term Suratrana appears in a Warangal inscription dated to about 1570 CE, for Aravidu king Tirumala I, as Urigola Suratranah meaning the "Suratranah of Urigola" or "Suratranah of Warangal". Wagoner interprets it as "Sultan of Warangal".

See also
Hammira, Sanskrit transliteration of emir
Balhara (title), Arabic transliteration of Sanskrit Vallabha

Notes

Reference

Sanskrit words and phrases
Sultans